The China Railways JF6 (解放6, Jiěfàng, "liberation") class steam locomotive was a class of 2-8-2 steam locomotives for freight trains operated by the China Railway. They were originally built in Japan and Manchukuo between 1934 and 1944 for the South Manchuria Railway (Mantetsu), the Manchukuo National Railway, and the North China Transportation Company.

History

Mantetsu Mikasa class (ミカサ)
Needing a replacement for the Sorii-class locomotives transferred to the Manchukuo National in 1933, Mantetsu ordered the construction of replacements for use on light freight trains and for shunting duties. The result was the Mikasa (ミカサ) class, which was a smaller, lighter version of the Mikai-class 2-8-2s already in service, and 43 were built in Japan for Mantetsu in 1934 by Kawasaki, Kisha Seizō, Hitachi, and Nippon Sharyō. Numbered 1400 through 1442, the last 22 - 1421 through 1442 - were built with a sloped tender designed to allow greater rearwards visibility during shunting operations. Later, some were fitted with a booster engine for use on mountainous lines.

26 of the design were built in the same year for the Manchukuo National, which designated them Mikaro (ミカロ) class. Numbered 6600 through 6625, these were known as the "National Small Mika" (國小ミカ), distinguishing them from the Mikana-class "National Big Mika" (国大ミカ) introduced the previous year. After some modifications to the design, another 22 were built in 1935 for the Manchukuo National; these were known as the "New National Small Mika" (新國小ミカ) and were numbered 6626 through 6647.

Under the unified classification system of 1938, the Mantetsu Mikasa and Mikaro classes, and the Manchukuo National Mikaro classes were grouped together and classified Mikaro class.

Mantetsu Mikaro class (ミカロ)

To operate on its North Chosen Line in the north-eastern part of Korea, Mantetsu ordered a number of locomotives designed to burn the low-calorie lignite found in abundance in Korea. Along with the Puresa-class 2-6-2 tank locomotives and the Pashisa-class 4-6-2 passenger locomotives, Mantetsu's Mikaro (ミカロ) class formed the backbone of the power in use on the North Chosen Line. Although the Mikaro class was based on the Mikasa design, care was taken during the design process to maximise the number of parts shared between the Mikaro and Pashisa class locomotives.

The Mikaro class entered production in 1935, with 22 being built between then and 1938, for use on the North Chosen Line. As more were built after 1938, they were put into service on other Mantetsu lines as well, and between 1935 and 1944, a total of 58, initially numbered 1480 through 1499, 11400, and 11401, were built for Mantetsu by Kawasaki, Kisha Seizo, Nippon Sharyo, Mantetsu's Shahekou Works, and the Dalian Machine Works; these were the first locomotives built by the Dalian Machine Works.

The Manchukuo National also ordered the new design with the larger firegrate, taking delivery of 171 between 1936 and 1944. Like the Sorisa-class, they were fitted with a regauging device to allow operation on Russian  gauge lines, in anticipation of a possible Japanese invasion of the Soviet Far East. Given the Mikaro classification too and initially numbered 6648 through 6699 and 16600 through 16638, in the 1938 unified numbering system they became Mikaro class 549 through 629; the units built after the renumbering were numbered 630 through 639 and 645 through 724; the missing numbers, 640-644, are those that were assigned to locomotives that were diverted to the North China Transportation Company before they could be delivered to the Manchukuo National.

In addition to the five diverted from the Manchukuo National, 72 Mikaro class locomotives were built by Kisha Seizō for North China Transport in 1938−1939 and 1943−1944; North China Transport operated over 100 locomotives of the class.

A number of Mikaro-class locomotives were loaned to the West Chosen Central Railway in 1944–45 to alleviate power shortages on that line.

Mikaku class (ミカク)

At the request of the Kwantung Army, the Dalian Machine Works (other sources say Mitsubishi's Kobe Shipyards) built a single experimental condenser version of the Mikaro class in 1941. This was designated the ミカク (Mikaku) class and numbered ミカク501, as a Manchukuo National unit. A flue gas turbine was installed in front of the locomotive's chimney, with the exhaust pipe leading to a condenser on the tender, where the steam was cooled down and recycled into water again, to allow for operations over long distances without having to take on water; this was a major concern in the northern part of Manchuria, where it was difficult to secure water for the locomotives. In tests, Mikaku 501 recorded  without taking on more water, but the design was never put into production.

Postwar

China Railways 解放6 (JF6) class

Of the 320 Mikaro class locomotives owned by Mantetsu and the Manchukuo National Railway, at the end of the Pacific War 20 were assigned to the Dairen Port Railway Bureau, 38 to the Mukden Bureau, 32 to the Jinzhou Bureau, 68 to the Mudanjiang Bureau, 29 to the Harbin Bureau, and 50 to the Qiqihar Bureau, whilst a further 75 were loaned out to other railways in China. These 312 locomotives were handed over to the Republic of China Railways in 1945; the remaining eight were on loan to the West Chosen Central Railway and ended up in North Korea.

After the establishment of the People's Republic of China, China Railways designated these the ㄇㄎ陸 (MK6) class in 1951, and in 1959 they were reclassified 解放6 (JF6) class; all former Mika-class locomotives were grouped together in the 解放 Class (Jiěfàng, "liberation"). A final batch of five JF6 were built in China between 1958 and 1960. The Mikaro class locomotives inherited from Mantetsu, the Manchukuo National and North China Transport, along with the five built new after the war, were numbered by China Railways in the 3001−3475 range. Although Chinese sources quote a number series of JF6 3001−3600, 3475 is the highest number to have been reported. It is probable that the last 120 locos were never built as the highest number reported, JF6 3475, is one of the final batch and carries Shenyang 1959 plates.

Those in industrial use were active until the late 1990s.

The JF6 was the predecessor of the more modern SY class, which was a further development of the JF6 design.

Currently, JF6 3022 is preserved at the China Railway Museum in Beijing, whilst JF6 3329 is preserved at the Shenyang Steam Locomotive Museum.

Korean State Railway 미가유 (Migayu) class/6600 series

Due to locomotive shortages, a number (believed to be eight) of Mikaro class locomotives were loaned from Mantetsu to the West Chosen Central Railway; these were taken over by the Korean State Railway of North Korea after the end of the war. In addition to these, the Korean State Railway also received around 70 JF class locomotives, including JF6s, from China as aid during the Korean War. Regardless of origin, the Mikaro class locomotives were initially designated 미가유 class (Migayu), and later renumbered in the 6600 series.

Korean National Railroad 미카6 (Mika6) class

In 1947, the US military ordered five Mikaro-class locomotives for the Korean National Railroad of South Korea from Kisha Seizō; These, together with the former Sentetsu Mika1 and Mika2 class locomotives that the KNR had converted to run on lignite in the early 1950s, were designated Mika6 (미카6) class by the KNR.

Vietnam Railways Giải Phóng 6 (GP6) class

During the Vietnam War, China supplied around sixty JF6 class locomotives to the Vietnam Railways as aid, which designated them class Giải Phóng 6 ("liberation"). Two dumped locos at Laibin, are said to be ex-Vietnam.

See also 
China Railways JF
China Railways SY

Notes

References

2-8-2 locomotives
Railway locomotives introduced in 1934
Shahekou Works locomotives
Kawasaki locomotives
Hitachi locomotives
Kisha Seizo locomotives
Nippon Sharyo locomotives
Steam locomotives of China
Standard gauge locomotives of China
Rolling stock of Manchukuo
Locomotives of Korea
Locomotives of South Korea
Locomotives of North Korea
Standard gauge locomotives of Vietnam
Steam locomotives of Vietnam